The  Spokane Shock season was the tenth season for the arena football franchise, and the sixth in the Arena Football League. The team was coached by Andy Olson and played their home games at the Spokane Veterans Memorial Arena. The Shock finished with a 7–11 record, but finished second in the Pacific division for a second straight year and once again qualified for the playoffs.

Standings

Schedule

Regular season
The 2015 regular season schedule was released on December 19, 2014.

Playoffs

Roster

References

Spokane Shock
Spokane Shock seasons
Spokane Shock